Carlos Alberto Cerutti (Morteros, February 12, 1969 – Córdoba, May 3, 1990) was an Argentine professional basketball player.

Biography
Cerutti was a three time Argentine league champion with Atenas (in 1987, 1988, and 1990). He was selected as the league's finals Most Valuable Player in 1988, and also participated in the league's all-star games of 1989 and 1990.

Cerutti also represented the Argentine national team. He won the 1987 South American Championship, and the 1988 Youth South American Championship with his country.

Cerutti suffered serious injuries in a car accident on April 21, 1990. He was admitted to a hospital at Córdoba City, where died on May 3, 1990, aged 21. Cerutti died after the last game of the 1990 Argentine baskbetall league's regular season. His team, Atenas, went on to win the league's championship.

Honours

Club
Atenas
 Liga Nacional de Básquet (3): 1987, 1988, 1990

Individual
 LNB Finals MVP (1): 1988
 Atenas' arena named Polideportivo Municipal Carlos Cerutti in his honour

References

1969 births
1990 deaths
Argentine men's basketball players
Atenas basketball players
Sportspeople from Córdoba Province, Argentina
Road incident deaths in Argentina
Centers (basketball)